Salvatore Adamo (born November 1, 1943) is a Belgian-Italian musician, singer and composer, who is known for his romantic ballads. Adamo was born in Comiso, Sicily, Italy, and has lived in Belgium since the age of three, which is why he has dual citizenship.

Since 2001 Adamo holds the Belgian noble title of Ridder, similar to the English title of "Knight". 

He first gained popularity throughout Europe and later in the Middle East, Latin America, Japan, and the United States. He has sold more than 80 million albums and 20 million singles making him one of the most commercially successful musicians in the world. He mainly performs in French but has also sung in Italian, Dutch, English, German, Spanish, Japanese, and Turkish. "Tombe la neige", "La nuit", "Vous permettez, Monsieur ?", "Inch'Allah" and "C'est ma vie" remain his best known songs. He is currently the best selling Belgian musician of all time.

Early life

The father of Adamo, Antonio, emigrated to Belgium in February 1947 to work as a colliery worker in the mines of Marcinelle. Four months later his wife, Concetta, and their son, Salvatore, joined him in the town of Ghlin, (Mons) before moving to Jemappes, (Mons).

In 1956, Salvatore was bedridden for a year with meningitis.

Salvatore's parents did not want their son to become a miner, so he went to a Catholic school run by the Frères des Ecoles Chrétiennes. By 1960, the family of Antonio and Concetta Adamo had seven children overall. Salvatore grew up in Jemappes (Mons), where he was a dedicated student at school and distinguished himself in music and the arts.

Career

Adamo's early influences were the poetry of Victor Hugo and Jacques Prévert, the music of French singer-songwriters like Georges Brassens, and the Italian canzonette. He started singing and composing his own songs from an early age. His debut was in a Radio Luxembourg competition, where he participated as singer and composer of the song "Si j'osais" ("If I dared"), winning the competition's final held in Paris on 14 February 1960.

Adamo's first hit was "Sans toi, ma mie", in 1963, from his debut album 63/64. He followed this with a series of hits, the most famous being "Tombe la neige" ("The snow falls") in 1963, "La nuit" ("The Night") in 1964, "Mes mains sur tes hanches" ("My hands on your hips") in 1965 and "Inch'Allah". The self-penned "Petit bonheur" ("Little Happiness") sold over one million copies by April 1970, and was awarded a gold disc.

Adamo has sold over 100 million copies of recordings worldwide. He has recorded in many languages and, besides France and Belgium, had hits in Italy, the Netherlands, Germany, Spain, Portugal, Turkey and also in Japan, where he toured repeatedly. He has had hits and toured also in Latin America and throughout the Middle East.

In Chile, the audience awarded him an appreciation prize known as the "Antorcha" (Gold and Silver Torch) at the "Festival de Viña del Mar" held yearly in the "Quinta Vergara", at the seaside resort of Viña del Mar, where he once had to sing in three different, sold-out venues in the same night. In the 1980s, Adamo's career faltered, as the style of his music was no longer fashionable. Since the 1990s, however, and on the crest of a nostalgia wave, he has successfully resumed composing, issuing records and touring, starting with a full season at the Casino de Paris venue in April 1990.

In popular culture

Adamo was the cast in the film Les Arnaud (1967), which starred Bourvil. Amália Rodrigues recorded "Inch'Allah" in French. The song "Tombe la neige", one of his many international hits, has been covered in Bulgarian, Turkish ("Her Yerde Kar Var"), Japanese, Portuguese, Spanish, Italian and Chinese (Cantopop).

Honours
In 2001, Adamo was raised into the Belgian nobility (with motto Humblement mais dignement) by King Albert II and given for life the Belgian noble title Ridder. He was appointed an Officer of the Belgian Order of the Crown in 2002. In 2014, Adamo was honoured at Victoires de la Musique in France.

Personal life
In 1984, Adamo had heart problems which necessitated a heart bypass operation and a temporary though total withdrawal from work. Since 1993, he has been an honorary UNICEF ambassador from Belgium and, in this capacity, has visited countries such as Vietnam, Lebanon, Bosnia and Herzegovina, Kosovo, Afghanistan and others. In 2004, health problems forced him to cancel a scheduled tour but, since 2007, he is touring again. In December 2011, he performed in Espinho, Portugal and Bucharest, Romania.

At the end of the 1960s, Adamo married Nicole. Their children were Anthony (born in 1969), Benjamin, and then Amélie. At the height of his stardom, his own father died by drowning on 7 August 1966. His younger sister Délizia was also a recording artist. He wrote a number of songs for his sister, including her debut hit "Prends le chien" in 1974. She also joined him in his tour in 1975.

Discography

Studio albums
 1962 : Sans Toi Ma mie (Pathé-Marconi Records – France)
 1963 : Chansons non-commerciales (Belgium)
 1964 : Tombe la neige
 1964 : Vous Permettez Monsieur (Canada)
 1964 : Mes 21 ans (Canada)
 1965 : La Nuit, vol. 2
 1967 : Notre roman (Canada)
 1967 : Ton nom (Canada)
 1968 : J'ai tant de rêves dans mes bagages
 1968 : Chansons pour l'été (Canada)
 1969 : Petit Bonheur
 1971 : Chansons de mes seize ans (Rerelease Emidisc)
 1972 : Quand tu reviendras
 1973 : A ceux qui rêvent encore
 1975 : Mademoiselle attendez (Canada) (with 7 unpublished titles in France)
 1975 : Jusqu'à l'amour
 1976 : Voyage jusqu'à toi
 1977 : Et on chantait
 1979 : Pauvre Liberté
 1981 : " Printemps sous la neige" (Japan, disques "Victor" with 6 unpublished titles in France)
 1982 : Puzzle
 1986 : Autre chose (Double album Belgium RCA Ariola/Charles TALAR)
 1987 : Avec des si
 1989 : Sur la route des étoiles
 1992 : Rêveur de fond
 1995 : La Vie comme elle passe
 1997 : Regards
 2001 : Par les temps qui courent
 2003 : Zanzibar
 2007 : La Part de l'ange
 2008 : Le Bal des gens bien (Remake of Adamo songs as duos with 18 other singers)
 2010 : De toi à moi
 2012 : La grande roue
 2014 : Adamo chante Bécaud
 2016 : L'Amour n'a jamais tort
 2018 : Si vous saviez...

Albums (other languages)
In German
 1988 : Seine Grossen Erfolge
 1999 : Single Hits
 2003 : So Bin Ich, Das Beste
 2011 : All the Best (allemand)

Spanish
1981 : Aquellas manos en tu cintura
1986 : Buscador de oro
1990 : Las mejores canciones
1998 : Simplemente lo mejor
2003 : Lo mejor de...48 – Grandes éxitos
2004 : En Chile – Live
2004 : 24 Grandes éxitos en castellano
2005 : Mis manos en tu cintura
2006 : Voces del amor
2011 : 30 Grandes de

Compilation albums
 1962 : Adamo, (25 cm, Polydor)
 1966? : 'Hits of Adamo' (hits from 1963, 1964, 1965 and 1966 – Orchestra conducted by O.Saintal and A. Goraguer, English sleeve note EMI LP 3601)
 1974 : -EMI/Odeon (Greatest hits in Spanish)
 1978 :  (CBS, new arrangements by Roger Loubet and Franck Fiévez – with )
 1993 : 30 ans (20 great songs, new recordings CARRERE/WEA)
 1993 :  (1979/1991) (AMC Belgium, unreleased titles)
 2002 :  (Double CD Atoll Sony 1979/1994 with unreleased titles)
 2002 :  (compilation – Long Box 3 CDs EMI)
 2003 :  1963/1975 (compilation – first 12 albums, EMI)
 2003 :  (Long Box 3 CDs EMI (with previously unreleased titles and foreign versions)
 2005 : Platinum Collection (compilation – 3 CD collection, EMI, 2 unreleased tracks)
In Italian
 1996:  
1998: 
1998: 
2005: Studio Collection

Live albums
 1965 : Adamo à l'Olympia
 1967 : Olympia 67
 1968 : A la place des arts de Montréal (Canada)
 1969 : Olympia 69
 1969 :  Adamo in Japan live
 1970 : Adamo in Deutschland: Live-Konzert aus der Philharmonie in Berlin (Double album)
 1971 : Olympia 71
 1972 : Live in Japan 72
 1974 : Live in Japan 74
 1977 : Olympia 77 (CBS)
 1981 : Live au Théâtre des Champs-Élysées 80 (Teldec Germany Import EMI) (Double album)
 1982 : Japan concert 81 (disques Victor double album with le Choral Echo and String Orchestra Arrangements Gérard Sabbe)
 1984 :  Japan Best sélection (studio remix of 20 live tracks Concert 81) (Rereleased 1990 and 1992 in France 16 titles – Pomme Music Sony)
 1992 : Live in Japan (EMI Toshiba Japan) (CD and DVD with different tracks at times)
 1992 : A l'Olympia – Collection Or (Sony International) (Olympia '77 + 4 titles in studio)
 1994 : C'est ma vie. Le meilleur d'Adamo en public (At Théâtre Royal de Mons) (Double CD Flarenasch Carrère, 34 titles)
 1994 : Symphonic'Adamo Live à Liège on 22 Avril 1994) (SA Music)
 1994 : C'est Ma Vie – Enregistrement public (Flarenasch Carrère France) ("Les meilleurs moments" 18 titles)
 1998 : Best Of – Le meilleur En Public (Wagram France)
 2002 : A l'Olympia (Wagram France 1995 / 2002)
 2004 : Un soir au Zanzibar (En public au Cirque Royal de Bruxelles) (Double CD and DVD Polydor)
 2004 : En Vivo, Estadio Chile 2003 (Double album EMI in Spanish live – EMI Chili)

Singles
(Selective)
1963: "Tombe la neige" 
1963: "Sans toi mamie"
1963: "Amour perdu"
1963: "N'est-ce pas merveileux?"
1964: "Vous permettez, monsieur?"
1964: "La Nuit"
1964: "Quand les roses"
1964: "Si jamais"
1965: "Dolce Paola"
1965: "Les Filles du bord de mer" 
1965: "Elle..."
1965: "Mes mains sur tes hanches"
1965: "Viens ma brune"
1965: "J'aime"
1965: "Comme toujours"
1966: "Ton Nom"
1966: "Une meche de cheveux"
1966: "Tenez-vous bien"
1967: "Une larme aux nuages"
1967: "Inch'Allah"
1967: "Ensemble"
1967: "L'amour te ressemble"
1967: "Notre roman"
1967: "Le néon"
1968: "F... comme femme"
1968: "Le ruisseau de mon enfance"
1968: "Et sur la mer..."
1968: "Pauvre Verlaine"
1968: "L'Amour te ressemble" 
1968: "Une larme aux nuages" 
1968: "La valse d'été" 
1968: "J'ai tant de rêves dans mes bagages"
1969: "A demain sur la lune"
1969: "Petit bonheur"
1969: "Les gratte-ciel"
1970: "Va mon bateau"
1970: "Les belles dames"
1970: "Si le ciel est amoureux de toi"
1970: "Les belles dames" / Die schönen Damen
1970: "Alors.. reviens mois"
1971: "J'avais oublié que les roses sont roses"
1971: "Caresse"
1971: "Et t'oublier"
1971: "A demain sur la lune"
1971: "Sois heureuse rose"
1972: "Femme aux yeux d'amour"
1972: "Quand tu reviendras"
1972: "Mon amour, sors de chez toi"
1973: "Crazy Lue"
1973: "Gwendolina"
1973: "Rosalie, c'est la vie"
1973: "Marie la Mer"
1975: "C'est ma vie" 
1975: "Prête-moi une chanson"
1976: "Voyage jusqu'à toi"
1976: "J'ai trouvé un été"
1980: "Et on chantait"
1980: "C'est pas legal"
2013: "Des belles personnes"

Singles (other languages)
In German
1964: "Gestatten Sie, Monsieur?" (Vous permettez, Monsieur?) 
1965: "Eine Locke von deinem Haar" (Une mèche de cheveux) 
1966: "Das Wunder der Liebe" (Notre Roman)
1968: "Es geht eine Träne auf Reisen" (Une larme aux nuages)
1968: "Der Walzer des Sommers" (La valse d'été)
1969: "Du bist so wie die Liebe" (L'Amour te resemble)
1970: "Ein kleines Glück" (Petit bonheur) 
1970: "Komm in mein Boot" (Va mon bateau)
1971: "Bis morgen – auf dem Mond mit dir (A demain sur la lune) 
1971: "Gute Reise, schöne Rose" (Sois heureuse rose)
1971: "Ich muss wieder lernen, die Rosen zu sehen"
1972: "Liebe Tag für Tag"
1972: "Mädchen, wildes Mädchen" (Femme aux yeux d'amour) 
1972: "Die alte Dame, der Sänger und die Spatzen" (La vieille, l'idole et les oiseaux)
1975: "Leih' mir eine Melodie" (Prête-moi une chanson)
1976: "Die Reise zu dir" (Voyage jusqu'à toi)
1976: "Der Sommer, den ich fand" (J'ai trouvé un été)
1977: "Der Hund"
1978: "Klopfe beim Glück an die Tür" (Frappe à la porte du bonheur) 
1979: "Zweimal Glück und zurück"
1980: "...und dann ein Lied" (Et on chantait)
1980: "Unsere Hochzeit"
1981: "Du bist wieder da"
1985: "Kapitän, wohin fährt unser Boot"
1986: "Verborgenes Gold"
1988: "Es gibt noch Engel"
1988: "Que sera"
1994: "Nach allem, was war"

In Italian
1962: "Perché" / "Cara bambina"
1963: "Sei qui con me" / "Che funerale"
1963: "Perduto amore" / "Gridare il tuo nome"
1964: "Vous permettez Monsieur?" / "Non voglio nascondermi" 
1964: "Cade la neve" / "Lascia dire" 
1965: "Dolce Paola" / "Pazienza" 
1965: "La notte" (La Nuit) / "Non sei tu"
1965: "Non mi tenere il broncio" /"Lei"
1966: "Amo" / "Al nostro amore"
1966: "Una ciocca di capelli" / "Se mai"
1966: "Al nostro amore" 
1967: "Inch'Allah (se Dio vuole)" / "Insieme"
1967: "Domani sur la luna"
1968: "Affida una lacrima al vento" / "Fermare il tempo"
1968: "La tua storia è una favola" / "Un anno fa"
1968: "Tu somigli all'amore" / "Domani sulla luna"
1969: "Accanto a te l'estate" / "Piangi poeta"
1970: "Felicità" / "Noi"
1971: "Non aver paura" / "Il nostro amore"
1971: "Donna" / "Ma per te lo farei"
1972: "Bocca ciliegia pelle di pesca" / "Per un anno d'amore"
1973: "Donne dell'estate" / "Mi manchi tu"
1974: "E muore un amore" / "Ed ecco che vivo"
1975: "E la mia vita" / "La pace dei campi"
1976: "Un'estate per te" / "Ballo"
1981: "Cara Italia"
1987: "Mare" / "Lontano"

In Spanish
1964: "La noche" (La Nuit)
1965: "Permíteme Señor" / "Después"
1966: "Mis Manos en tu Cintura" / "Ella..." 
1966: "L'amour e Ressemble" / "Nada Que Hacer"
1967: "Le Neón" / "Marcia Anche Tu" 
1968: "Vals de Verano" / "Y Sobre el Mar" 
1968: "Inch' Allah" / "Nuestra Novela" 
1969: "El Arroyo de mi Infancia" / "Un Año Hará" 
1974: "Marie La Mer" / "Sólo Una Mujer" 
1975: "Los Campos en Paz" / "Es Mi Vida"

DVDs
 2004 : Un soir au Zanzibar (live)

Publications
1980: Le Charmeur d'Océans (preface by Raymond Devos – éditions Claude de la Lande)
1993: Les Mots de l'Ame (éditions Anne Sigier)
2001: Le Souvenir du Bonheur Est Encore du Bonheur (éditions Albin Michel)
2001: À Ceux Qui Rêvent Encore (éditions Albin Michel)

Bibliography
Adamo – C'est sa vie, Thierry Coljon, éditions du Félin (France), 2003

References

External links

Adamo Italian website

1943 births
Living people
Belgian knights
Belgian male singer-songwriters
Italian emigrants to Belgium
French-language singers of Belgium
Italian-language singers
People from Mons
Schlager musicians
Spanish-language singers
Pathé-Marconi artists
Capitol Records artists
20th-century Belgian male singers
20th-century Belgian singers
21st-century Belgian male singers
21st-century Belgian singers
French-language singers of Italy
German-language singers of Italy